Hate Crime and Public Order (Scotland) Act 2021 is an Act of the Scottish Parliament.

Background 
The Hate Crime and Public Order (Scotland) Bill was introduced to the Scottish Parliament in April 2020, following an independent review of Scotland's hate crime legislation carried out by Lord Bracadale, which recommended consolidation of all hate crime law into one bill. The Bill was controversial, with opponents staying it could stifle freedom of speech. One concern was the potential for the act to be used for prosecuting author J K Rowling for perceived transphobia. The Scottish Police Federation and the Law Society of Scotland expressed concerns over the freedom of expression.

The final vote on the Bill was delayed by a day after a number of amendments were proposed. The Bill passed on 11 March 2021, with 82 votes in favour, 32 votes against, and 4 abstentions.

Act 
The Act abolishes the offence of blasphemy, which had not been prosecuted in Scotland for more than 175 years.

References

Further reading 

 

Acts of the Scottish Parliament 2021
Hate crime
Blasphemy law in Europe